South Korean girl group Girls' Generation (So Nyeo Si Dae), known as Shoujo Jidai in Japan and Shàonǚ Shídài in the Sinophone world, have performed over 150 concerts across Asia, playing to nearly three million people. They embarked on their first tour, Into The New World Tour in December 2009. Their next tour, The First Japan Tour, was attended by 140,000 people.

The group subsequently followed up the success of their Japan tour by embarking on their eponymously titled third tour, the 2011 Girls' Generation Tour. The group then toured Japan for the second time in early 2013, with a total of 20 stops on their Second Japanese Tour.

In addition to their own headlining tours, the group has participated in multiple SMTown tours. The first was SMTown Live '08, and the following SMTown Live '10 World Tour saw the group (along with fellow SMTown acts) become the first Asian singers in history to reach the top 10 on the US Billboard Concert Boxcore chart. The group also performed on SMTown Live World Tour III, which stopped in Taiwan (ROC), Japan, South Korea, Singapore, Thailand, and Indonesia.

Headlining tours

Special lives

See also
 Girls' Generation discography
 Girls' Generation filmography
 Girls' Generation videography
 List of songs by Girls' Generation
 List of awards and nominations received by Girls' Generation

Notes

References

 
Lists of concert tours of South Korean artists
Lists of concert tours
Lists of events in South Korea
South Korean music-related lists
K-pop concerts by artist